Rent A Goat is a company founded in 2010 by 22-year-old entrepreneur Matthew Richmond, from Chapel Hill, North Carolina, which rents out goat herds for land-clearing purposes. Rent A Goat is part of a larger phenomenon called conservation grazing or targeted grazing whereby goats are used instead of traditional machinery or pesticides in order to curb unwanted invasive plant growth. Goat rental has since become a more publicly acceptable form of weed abatement according to The Street: "Whether you have just enough front or back yard to get overgrown and unwieldy or find yourself overrun with nasty, prickly, invasive plants that just won't go away, nature has already devised the ultimate solution to your problem."

The Maryland State Highway Department has enlisted a herd of 40 goats to graze the grass as an alternative to using lawn mowers.

History
In 2009, Google rented goats in Mountain View, California to clear overgrown lawns. The "U.S. Fish and Wildlife Service, the Bureau of Reclamation, the Bureau of Land Management, the Forest Service and the city of Seattle have all used goats to manage their property and keep grass, weeds and other plants at bay." California has reportedly used goats to reduce the occurrence of wildfire.  In 2013, a (non-ranked) mention was made of Rent A Goat in Entrepreneur Magazine's "Top 100 Brilliant Companies".

Usage
Nationally, various rent-a-goat companies have cropped up over the last ten years and are used in a wide variety of settings, including: homeowners, large and small properties, companies and commercial entities, universities, municipalities, such as roads and parks, government agencies, including military facilities. As ruminants, goats have a four-chambered stomach which allows them to digest a wide variety of vegetation. Their size and nimbleness makes them the perfect small plant removal system.

Goats are known to eat the following invasive plants:
 Thistle
 Blackberries
 Poison oak and poison ivy
 Kudzu
 Vines such as trumpet vine
 Sage brush
 Sapling trees (such as pine, cedar, oak)
 Broom sage

Constraints
Businesses akin to Rent A Goat have not yet proven their viability in the landscaping market. Cited difficulties include fencing, water, and the need to provide a place for the animals when not being used for vegetation management. Both research and extension activities are needed to develop and transfer the technology for improving the effectiveness and profitability of goats for vegetation management.
While goats are relatively inexpensive and require only what they eat as fuel, companies may only provide as many as 30 at a time on their own or through farm subcontractors.  Goats can be effectively used to manage most types of vegetation, but greater knowledge is required before the full potential of using goats for vegetation management can be realized.

Benefits
One perceived benefit of using goats to clear invasive weeds is their ability to handle rocky and steep terrain that humans or machines can't normally clear easily. In some situations, their cost is also less, when compared to heavy machinery. Goats are reportedly "an environmentally friendly method for clearing areas containing invasive vegetation... thinning by goats is a natural method resulting in a naturally balanced environment over the long term."

A North Carolina study compared the effectiveness of goats versus chemicals in clearing kudzu from an infested area, and found the goats to be drastically more effective than were the chemicals.  Goats can also reduce the threat of forest fires by cleaning up combustible materials without the need for any chemicals or gas-powered machinery.

Media Attention
The concept has gained surprisingly notoriety since 2010, and has appeared on The Today Show, Regis and Kelly The Colbert Report, in AOL News, TreeHugger, The Wall Street Journal, The Associated Press, and in the book Mrs. Lizzy is Dizzy!

References

External links
 Rent A Goat Website

Goats